Tha It may refer to:
 Tha It, Mueang Uttaradit, a subdistrict in Mueang Uttaradit District, Thailand
 Tha It, Pak Kret, a subdistrict in Pak Kret District, Nonthaburi, Thailand